This article lists the deputies who served in the 14th legislature of the French Fifth Republic, elected in the 2012 legislative elections, elected in by-elections, or alternates succeeding deputies.

Parliamentary groups

List of deputies

Former deputies

Notes 

14th
14th